Systematic & Applied Acarology is a peer-reviewed scientific journal covering research on mites and ticks published trianually by the Systematic & Applied Acarology Society.

In 2012, the society's rapid journal for papers and monographs on mites and ticks, Systematic & Applied Acarology Special Publications, was merged with Systematic and Applied Acarology.

Abstracting and indexing 
The journal is abstracted and indexed in Science Citation Index Expanded, Current Contents, BIOSIS Previews, CAB Abstracts, and The Zoological Record.

References

External links 
 

Acarology journals
English-language journals
Publications established in 1996
Triannual journals
Academic journals published by learned and professional societies